The bold characodon (Characodon audax) is a species of fish in the family Goodeidae that is  endemic to Mexico. Its habitat is springfed ponds and small creeks with still or slow flowing water.

References

Characodon
Freshwater fish of Mexico
Endemic fish of Mexico
Fish described in 1986
Taxonomy articles created by Polbot